Joseph Carrington Cabell (1778-1856) was an American politician. He was member of the Virginia House of Delegates from 1808 to 1810 and 1831 to 1835 and the Senate of Virginia from 1810 to 1829.

References 

1778 births
1856 deaths
Members of the Virginia House of Delegates
Virginia state senators